Crécy is a graphic novel written by Warren Ellis and illustrated by Raulo Cáceres, depicting some of the events surrounding the historical Battle of Crécy (1346). The graphic novel was published in 2007 by Avatar Press, under the Apparat imprint. The story is told from the point of view of the fictional William of Stonham, a sarcastic and foul-mouthed English longbowman. It features several important characters from the event, including Edward III and Philip VI, the kings of England and France respectively.

See also
V sign, the two-fingered "Longbowman's Salute" described in Crécy, and shown on the cover of the book.

References

External links
www.warrenellis.com - CRÉCY
Crécy Review At The KvltSite

2007 graphic novels
2007 comics debuts
Comics set in the 14th century
American graphic novels
Avatar Press titles
Comics by Warren Ellis
Edward III of England
Hundred Years' War in fiction